= Disability in Vietnam =

Disability in Vietnam is relatively common compared to the overall population. As of 2009, an estimated 6.1 people, or 7.8% of the population, over the age of 5 years, lived with one or more disabilities. Other estimates by non-profit organizations place this number higher, at up to 15.3%.

== History ==
The first national law, the Vietnam National Law on Disability, guaranteeing the rights of people with disabilities in Vietnam was passed in 2010. Vietnam also participates in the Biwako Framework, an outline for societies to become more inclusive in the Asia-Pacific region. On 28 November 2014, the National Assembly of Vietnam ratified the Convention on the Rights of Persons with Disabilities. The national law, the Labour Code of 2012, and the National Action Plan to Support People with Disabilities all emphasize equal access to employment and education for people with disabilities.

A contributing factor to disabilities in Vietnam is parental exposure to Agent Orange, a herbicide used by the American military during the Vietnam War (in Vietnam called the American War), that led to birth defects and neurological impairments. Disability prevalence in Vietnam is higher than what is typically observed in other countries and this number increases in Agent Orange hot spots, such as the city of Da Nang.

=== Social stigma ===
In Vietnam, having a disability is often viewed as a consequences of the sins of a parent or ancestor, and the disability of a child is viewed by the parents as a misfortune. This view also contributes to the social stigmatization of mothers of children with disabilities, who sometimes face social isolation and on average have small social networks than their peers. The belief that disability is caused by ghosts is more common in rural Vietnam.

== Statistics ==
Compared to people without disabilities, people with disabilities in Vietnam have lower rates of literacy and education, as well as higher rates of living in poverty.

Despite the rapid growth of the Vietnamese economy, since the end of the American War, the government provides little assistance to people with disabilities and their families, most of whom disproportionately live in poverty. The Vietnamese Ministry of Labor, Invalids, and Social Affairs (MOLISA) estimated that, as of 2009, 32.5% of households of people with disabilities are poor. Non-governmental organizations provide important support but are often provide only a narrowly defined set of interventions.

The first large-scale National Survey on People with Disabilities was conducted in 2016. The survey found that 7% (6.2 million people) of the population aged 2 years and older have a disability, while 13% (almost 12 million people) live in a household with a person who has a disability. These numbers are expected to rise as the population ages.

=== Children with disabilities ===
In 1999, it was estimated that 2 to 6% of children in Vietnam have some form of disability.

Primary school enrollment for children with disability is about 69%, compared to 96% among children without disabilities. In 2010, the Vietnamese National Coordinating Council on Disability (NCCD) estimated that among children with disabilities, 55% of girls and 39% of boys have never attended school; among children who do attend, one-third drop out before completing their basic education. In the same report, the NCCD estimated that only 21% of Vietnamese vocational institutes are able to provided work readiness training to people with disabilities.
